A quad coupé was a marketing term used by the car manufacturers Mazda and (now defunct) Saturn to describe their four-door models with coupé-like proportions and rear-opening rear doors (clamshell doors, sometimes called suicide doors). To make it easier to enter and exit the rear seats, these quad coupés do not have a B-pillar.

Examples 
 Mazda RX-8
 Saturn Ion
 Subaru B11S

Gallery

See also 
 Coupé

References

Car body styles
Coupés